Phlyctaenomorpha is a genus of moths of the family Crambidae.

Species
Phlyctaenomorpha afghanalis Amsel, 1970
Phlyctaenomorpha sinuosalis (Cerf, [1910])

References
Notes

Bibliography
Natural History Museum Lepidoptera genus database

Odontiinae
Crambidae genera
Taxa named by Hans Georg Amsel